Fosen Trafikklag is a company operating buses and ferries in Trøndelag and Østlandet in Norway. In total the company has approximately 750 vehicles and 16 ships, though numerous of them operate by subsidiaries.

The company merged with Namos Trafikkselskap in 2008 to form FosenNamsos Sjø AS. And in 2010 the company was merged into Torghatten ASA.

History
The company was founded on 14 December 1957 as a merger between seven bus and ferry companies in Trøndelag. The seven companies included Hevne Dampskibsselskap (founded 1885), Uttrøndelag Dampskibsselskap (1889), Fosen Aktie Dampskibsselskab (1904), Fosenhalvøya Billag (1937), Fosen Dampskipsselskap (1950) and Trondheimsfjorden Fosenferja (1955).

In 1993 the company moved to its new terminal, Pirterminalen at Brattøra in the harbour area of Trondheim, and in 1994 the passenger ferries moved there too. In 1996 Fosen got the concession to operate Norway's second largest car ferry line between Moss and Horten in the Oslo Fjord through the subsidiary Bastø Fosen. In 1999 the company bought 66% of TrønderBilene from the Nord-Trøndelag county municipality. The next year the bus division of Fosen was sold to TrønderBilene. Between 2000 and 2003 the company also bought Norgesbuss, operating buses in Oslo and Akershus and the ferry company Innherredsferja in 2004.

Operations

Bastø Fosen AS

Bastø Fosen operates the ferries between Horten and Moss in the Oslo Fjord. The company has three ferries, 130 employees and a revenue of NOK 180 million. Offices are located at Kolbotn.

Berg-Hansen
The parent company owns two travel agencies in the Berg-Hansen franchise, located in Trondheim and Brekstad.

Cafés
The parent company also operates cafés at ferry terminals and onboard ferries. This division has 70 employees and a revenue of NOK 68 million.

Norgesbuss AS
Norgesbuss operates bus services in Oslo and Akershus for the respective counties. The company also operates express buses and airport coaches. The company has 478 vehicles, 853 employees and a revenue of NOK 472 million.

Shipping Midt-Norge

The ferries in Trøndelag are operated by the parent company. This division has 13 ships, 130 employees and a revenue of NOK 175 million.

TrønderBilene AS
Fosen Trafikklag owned 66% while Nord-Trøndelag county municipality owned the remaining 34% of the company. In 2011 Torghatten ASA bought the remaining 34% from Nord-Trøndelag. TrønderBilene is responsible for all the groups bus transport in Trøndelag and operates with concession from the counties of Nord-Trøndelag and Sør-Trøndelag. TrønderBilene has 265 vehicles, 309 employees and a revenue of NOK 212 million. The offices are located in Levanger. TrønderBilene owns 39% of Gauldal Billag that again owns Østerdal Billag.

References

 
Companies based in Trondheim
Shipping companies of Norway
Bus companies of Trøndelag
Ferry companies of Trøndelag
Transport companies established in 1957
Norwegian companies established in 1957